WISEPA J041022.71+150248.5 (abbreviated WISE 0410+1502) is a sub-brown dwarf of spectral class Y0, located in constellation Taurus. Being approximately 21.6 light-years from Earth, it is one of the Sun's nearest neighbors, especially assuming outdated parallax by Marsh et al., corresponding to even closer distance of approximately 14 light-years.

History of observations

Discovery
WISE 0410+1502 was discovered in 2011 from data, collected by Wide-field Infrared Survey Explorer (WISE) Earth-orbiting satellite — NASA infrared-wavelength 40 cm (16 in) space telescope, which mission lasted from December 2009 to February 2011. WISE 0410+1502 has two discovery papers: Kirkpatrick et al. (2011) and Cushing et al. (2011), however, basically with the same authors and published nearly simultaneously.

Kirkpatrick et al. presented discovery of 98 new found by WISE brown dwarf systems with components of spectral types M, L, T and Y, among which also was WISE 0410+1502.
Cushing et al. presented discovery of seven brown dwarfs — one of T9.5 type, and six of Y-type — first members of the Y spectral class, ever discovered and spectroscopically confirmed, including "archetypal member" of the Y spectral class WISE 1828+2650, and WISE 0410+1502. These seven objects are also the faintest seven of 98 brown dwarfs, presented in Kirkpatrick et al. (2011).

Distance

Space motion
WISE 0410+1502 has a large proper motion of  milliarcseconds per year. The brown dwarf WISE 0410+1502 lies in local void 6.5 parsecs across, where relatively few stars and brown dwarfs are located.

Temperature

See also
The other six discoveries of brown dwarfs, published in Cushing et al. (2011):
WISE 0148-7202 (T9.5)
WISE 1405+5534 (Y0 (pec?))
WISE 1541-2250 (Y0.5)
WISE 1738+2732 (Y0)
WISE 1828+2650 (>Y2)
WISE 2056+1459 (Y0)

Notes

References

Brown dwarfs
Y-type stars
Taurus (constellation)
20110901
WISE objects